Martin Rhonheimer (born 1950 in Zurich, Switzerland) is a Swiss political philosophy professor and priest of the Catholic personal prelature Opus Dei.  he is teaching professor at the Opus Dei-affiliated Pontifical University of the Holy Cross in Rome.

Life
Rhonheimer was born 1950 in Zurich, Switzerland into a Swiss Jewish family. He studied philosophy, history, political science and theology in Zurich and Rome.

In 1974, he joined the personal prelature Opus Dei as a numerary member.
In 1983, he was ordained a priest.

 he teaches at the Opus Dei-affiliated Pontifical University of the Holy Cross in Rome. His main interests are in political philosophy, ethics, the history of liberalism.

Opinions
Rhonheimer's regular editorials have been published by the German FAZ and Neue Zürcher Zeitung.

Separation of church and state
In 2014, Rhonheimer wrote that a foundational element of Christianity was the separation of church and politics, which could be understood as synonymous to separation of church and state.

Economy
In 2017, Rhonheimer criticized Pope Francis' view that "this economy kills". He supports neoliberal views of entrepreneurship, for which free market capitalism is "necessary". He says that "seeking profits is good per se and in a free and lawfully ordered market system it creates wellbeing for everyone". He criticizes Catholic social teachings because there were "no exact formulations in the New Testament" and they "had always been a product of their time".
["In the meantime, we have gotten a welfare-state church-system, because the church has become so integrated into the structures of the redistributive tax and welfare state that it is no longer free to question a system that, for example, blatantly contradicts the principle of subsidiarity and provides economically false incentives."]

Books
Rhonheimer has published a dozen books on topics concerning the philosophy of moral action, virtue, natural law, Aquinas, Aristotle, the ethics of sexuality and bioethics.

Familie und Selbstverwirklichung. Alternativen zur Emanzipation. Verlag Wissenschaft und Politik, Köln 1979(German)
Natur als Grundlage der Moral. Die personale Struktur des Naturgesetzes bei Thomas von Aquin: Eine Auseinandersetzung mit autonomer und teleologischer Ethik. Tyrolia-Verlag, Innsbruck-Wien 1987 (German)
La prospettiva della morale. Fondamenti dell'etica filosofica. Armando, Roma 1994
La filosofia politica di Thomas Hobbes. Coerenza e contraddizioni di un paradigma. Armando, Roma 1997
Etica della procreazione. Contraccezione - Fecondazione artificiale - Aborto. Edizioni PUL-Mursia, Milano 2000
Natural Law and Practical Reason: A Thomist View of Moral Autonomy. Fordham University Press, 2000,  (Translation of Natur als Grundlage der Moral)
Changing the World - The Timeliness of Opus Dei. 152 pages, Scepter Publishers (March 9, 2009) .
(Die Verwandlung der Welt. Zur Aktualität des Opus Dei. Adamas Verlag, Köln 2006 (German)
The Perspective of the Acting Person: Essays in the Renewal of Thomistic Moral Philosophy. CUA Press, 2008, 
Vital Conflicts in Medical Ethics: A Virtue Approach to Craniotomy and Tubal Pregnancies. Catholic University of America Press, 2009
The Ethics of Procreation and the Defense of Human Life: Contraception, Artificial Fertilization, and Abortion. 336 pages. The Catholic University of America Press (February 15, 2010)  (Abtreibung und Lebensschutz. Tötungsverbot und Recht auf Leben in der politischen und medizinischen Ethik. Verlag Ferdinand Schöningh, Paderborn, 2003. (German))
The Perspective of Morality: Philosophical Foundations of Thomistic Virtue Ethics. Catholic University of America Press, 2011

Articles in English available online
The Truth About Condoms. The Tablet, UK, 10 July 2004 (free registration required)
The Holocaust: What Was Not Said. First Things, no. 137, November 2003
Mel Gibson's "The Passion of the Christ": A Plea for Fairness. Logos, 8:I, Winter 2005 (PDF)

References

External sources
 
Rhonheimer's personal web site
List of publications

1950 births
Swiss Jews
20th-century Swiss Roman Catholic priests
Converts to Roman Catholicism from Judaism
Opus Dei members
Living people
21st-century Swiss Roman Catholic priests
Academic staff of the Pontifical University of the Holy Cross